Dioon argenteum is a species of cycad native to northern Oaxaca, Mexico. It is one of a number of Mexican Cycads described by Tim Gregory, S. Salas-Morales, and Jeff Chemnick, including Dioon planifolium.

References

A new species in the genus Dioon (Zamiaceae) from north‐central Oaxaca, Mexico

External links
 

argenteum
Flora of Mexico